Ray Martinez is an American politician and a Democratic former member of the Arizona House of Representatives elected to represent District 30 in 2016.

Elections
 2016 Martinez and Tony Navarrete defeated incumbent Jonathan Larkin in the Democratic primary and went on to defeat Republican Gary Cox the general election.
 2018 Martinez chose not to run for re-election.

References

External links
 Biography at Ballotpedia

Democratic Party members of the Arizona House of Representatives
Living people
Year of birth missing (living people)
Hispanic and Latino American state legislators in Arizona